The 1984–85 United Counties League season was the 78th in the history of the United Counties League, a football competition in England.

Premier Division

The Premier Division featured 18 clubs which competed in the division last season, along with two new clubs:
Brackley Town, promoted from Division One
Stotfold, transferred from the South Midlands League

League table

Division One

Division One featured 15 clubs which competed in the division last season, along with one new club:
Mirrlees Blackstone, joined from the Peterborough and District League

League table

References

External links
 United Counties League

1984–85 in English football leagues
United Counties League seasons